In graphonomics, Axial pen force is the component of the normal pen force that is parallel to the pen. It is dependent upon pen tilt. In the special case of a perfectly vertical orientation of the writing instrument the axial pen force
equals the normal pen force.

See also
Graphonomics

External links

http://hwr.nici.ru.nl/~miami/taxonomy/node54.html
http://hwr.nici.kun.nl/~miami/taxonomy/node57.html Pen ergonomics

Penmanship
Force